The Bocaina Mosaic is a protected area mosaic on the border between Rio de Janeiro and São Paulo, Brazil. It provides coordinated management for a group of 10 federal, state and municipal conservation units covering an area of Atlantic Forest along the coast and up the slopes of the Bocaina plateau.

Creation

A project to create three new protected area mosaics in the Serra do Mar Ecological Corridor began in December 2005, coordinated by the National Council of the Atlantic Forest Biosphere Reserve. These were the Bocaina Mosaic, Central Rio de Janeiro Atlantic Forest Mosaic and Mantiqueira Mosaic.
Funding was provided by Conservation International, the Fund for the Global Environment Facility (GEF), the Government of Japan, the MacArthur Foundation and the World Bank.

The Bocaina Mosaic was created by the ministry of the environment by decree 349 of 11 December 2006.
The mosaic acquired its formal structure in March 2007.
 The purpose is to give integrated management of different conservation units in the region, including federal, state, municipal and private units, which may be different types of strictly protected or sustainable use unit.

Extent and purpose

It is one of the main strongholds of Atlantic Forest vegetation, covered by dense rain forest (submontane, montane and high montane), high montane araucaria forest, alpine meadows, marine coastal and island ecosystems.
The environment is still in good condition despite many places where humans have interfered.

The Bocaina Mosaic aims to encourage integrated management of the various protected areas, contributing to the preservation and conservation of natural and fishing resources as well as sustainable development of the territory.
It is included in the Atlantic Forest Biosphere Reserve recognized by UNESCO.
The mosaic has an advisory board with representation of government agencies and civil society to provide integrated management of the conservation units and their buffer zones.

Conservation units
The conservation units include:

Notes

Sources

Protected area mosaics of Brazil
Protected areas of Rio de Janeiro (state)
Protected areas of São Paulo (state)
2006 establishments in Brazil